Aris Alfiansyah (born April 10, 1989) is an Indonesian footballer that currently plays for Persela Lamongan in the Indonesia Super League. From the 2008 to 2010 he also plays for Persela U-21 and he scored 12 goals for the team.

Club statistics

References

External links

1989 births
Association football forwards
Living people
Javanese people
Indonesian footballers
Liga 1 (Indonesia) players
Persela Lamongan players
KSB West Sumbawa players
Sportspeople from Surabaya